Vincenzo Prina (born 13 December 1936) is an Italian rower. He competed in the men's eight event at the 1960 Summer Olympics.

References

1936 births
Living people
Italian male rowers
Olympic rowers of Italy
Rowers at the 1960 Summer Olympics
Sportspeople from Varese